Lurelle Van Arsdale Guild (1898 in Syracuse, New York – 1985 in Darien, Connecticut) was an architect, industrial designer, and interior designer. After studying painting at Syracuse University (graduated 1920), Guild worked as an illustrator and writer. He started Lurelle Guild Associates in 1928. In 1944, Guild was a founding member of the Society of Industrial Designers in New York. (Genealogical sources indicate that Guild was actually born in Manhattan, NY on August 19, 1898. It is not known where the information came from that he was born in Syracuse).

Over the years, Guild's clients included Alcoa, Aluminum Cooking Utensil Company, Chase Brass & Copper Company, Electrolux, Heywood-Wakefield, International Silver Company, Kensington, Inc., Pullman Company, Revlon, and the Scranton Lace Company.

Designs in museums and exhibitions
One iconic design by Guild is his 1937-38 vacuum cleaner for Electrolux. Guild's design was manufactured until 1942, when the company suspended production to contribute to the war effort. After the war, the design went into production until 1954.

Lurelle Guild's designs are in several museum collections. In the Carnegie Museum of Art collection in Pittsburgh, there are several Guild designs for Kensington, Inc. (including platters, sugar bowl, teapot, coffeepot, milk jug, and a pitcher). In the Marshall Johnson Collection of Cookware and Appliance Design Drawings at the Hagley Museum and Library (Greenville, Delaware), there are several drawings of Guild's designs for Kensington Ware aluminum products (1922-1960).

Yale University Art Gallery holdings include designs by Guild including a canape plate and wine cooler for Chase Brass & Copper Company; the "Stratford" bowl for Kensington, Inc.; a "Regency" asparagus platter, "His Royal Highness" coffee service and "Chatham" pattern pitcher for International Silver Company; and the "Wear-ever" kettle for the Aluminum Cooking Utensil Company.

Guild's designs for the International Silver Company are included in the following museum collections: Cooper Hewitt, Smithsonian Design Museum, New York; Dallas Museum of Art; the Metropolitan Museum of Art and the Minneapolis Institute of Art. Guild's works for the International Silver Company has been in museum exhibitions including the touring exhibition American Modern, 1925-1940: Design for a new age (2001–02) and the touring Modernism in American silver: 20th century design show (2005–07). 

In 1934-35, Lurelle Guild exhibited his designs for a cocktail shaker and vegetable dish at the Metropolitan Museum of Art.

Family
Lurelle Guild married Anne Louise Eden in 1929; the couple had a daughter, Cynthia Eden Guild (born 1938-2017).

References

Other sources concerning Lurelle Guild
 Martin Grief, Depression Modern: The Thirties Style in America, New York: Universe, 1975, pp. 60, 174–79. | 
 Cat., J. Stewart Johnson, American Modern, 1925–1940, Design for a New Age, New York: Abrams, 2000. | 
 "Guild, Lurelle Van Arsdale (1898–1985)". In Mel Byars, The Design Encyclopedia, New York: The Museum of Modern Art, 2004, p. 219. |

External links
 Lurelle Guild Papers. Syracuse University Libraries, New York.
 Finding aid: Marshall Johnson Collection of Cookware and Appliance Design Drawings. Hagley Museum and Library, Greenville, Delaware.
 Gordon, John Stuart. (2013). Lurelle Guild's historical modernism: Americana and industrial design. PhD dissertation, Boston University. (page has pdf download).

American industrial designers
1985 deaths
1898 births